Duliskan-e Sofla (also Romanized as Dūlīskān-e Soflá) is a village in Qaedrahmat Rural District, Zagheh District, Khorramabad County, Lorestan Province, Iran. At the 2006 census, its population was 98, in 15 families.

References 

Towns and villages in Khorramabad County